NGC 615 is an unbarred spiral galaxy seen edge-on located in the constellation Cetus. It is located at a distance of circa 70 million light years from Earth, which, given its apparent dimensions, means that NGC 615 is about 75,000 light years across. It was discovered by William Herschel on January 10, 1785. NGC 615 belongs to the NGC 584 galaxy group, which also includes the galaxies NGC 584, NGC 596, NGC 600, and NGC 636.

The galaxy is included in the Herschel 400 Catalogue. It lies about three degrees northeast from Theta Ceti.

Characteristics 
The galaxy has been found to possess a chemically and dynamically decoupled nucleus. Further observations revealed two decoupled components, with the outer one identified as a disk. In the centre of the galaxy (<3" / 0.3 kpc) was found to exist an inclined circumnuclear disk. The stars in the circumnuclear disk have solar metallicity and their median age was determined at 5 billion years. In the bulge of NGC 615 (3"-6") was detected a counterrotating gaseous component.

Further away of the centre (8-30") lies the inner decoupled component, where stars and gas rotate together. The axis of the photometric component is turned and thus it was identified as a separate inner compact disk of oval shape. This disk contains HII regions, with the most prominent of them in Hα imaging being a pair located symmetrically with respect to the nucleus at the radius of 20"-23". The mean stellar age in the inner disk outside the HII regions is 5 billion years. The presence of a chemically decoupled nucleus and inner disk suggest a secondary burst of star formation, perhaps provoked by the close passage of another galaxy some gigayears ago.

The outer disk demonstrates a pair of low-contrast outer spiral arms or, more likely, a ring. Its inclination with respect to the line of sight is no more than 60°.

References

External links 

Unbarred spiral galaxies
Cetus (constellation)
0615
005897
Astronomical objects discovered in 1785
Discoveries by William Herschel